César Enrique Bernal Ávila (born 14 February 1995) is a Mexican professional footballer who plays as a defender. He made his professional debut with Santos Laguna during a Copa MX victory over Correcaminos UAT on 19 August 2014.

Honours
Tampico Madero
Liga de Expansión MX: Guardianes 2020

References

Living people
1995 births
Sportspeople from Torreón
Association football defenders
Santos Laguna footballers
Irapuato F.C. footballers
Club Celaya footballers
Tampico Madero F.C. footballers
Ascenso MX players
Liga Premier de México players
Footballers from Coahuila
Mexican footballers
21st-century Mexican people